Chilly Christmas is a 2012 direct-to-DVD family comedy film starring C. Thomas Howell, Karan Brar, Brooke Langton and Tom Arnold. In the United Kingdom the film was released under the title A Christmas Tail.

Plot
Eleven year old Bobby lives in Sunshine Beach in California with his police detective father and his best friend, a dog called Chilly. His dad tells him that they are moving to New York City, where they will live in a small apartment. Chilly, being a large outdoor dog and completely unhouse-trained, must stay behind. Bobby, with help from his friends, is determined to achieve a Christmas miracle and train Chilly to live in a flat. When dog thieves come to steal Chilly, the dog remembers the house tricks Bobby taught him and uses them to avoid being caught. Bobby's dad and the police arrive to find the boy and dog safe and the thieves foiled. His Dad decides not to move away and after a second Christmas miracle, snow in California, Bobby and Chilly celebrate, knowing they can stay together.

Cast
 C. Thomas Howell as Patrick Cole
 Bryson Sams as Bobby
 Karan Brar as Caps
 Cassidy Mack as Kizzy
 Brooke Langton as Lt. Mel Stone 
 Casey Graf as Jasper Harris
 Tom Arnold as Quarterman
 Andy Pandini as Claussen
 Jonathan Kowalsky as Hale

References

External links
 
  
 
 Chilly Christmas - WorldCat.org.

2012 direct-to-video films
2012 films
American children's comedy films
Films about dogs
2010s children's comedy films
2010s English-language films
2010s American films